Ellisville may refer to:

Places 
United States
Ellisville, Alabama
Ellisville, Illinois
Ellisville, Indiana
Ellisville, Massachusetts
Ellisville, Mississippi
Ellisville, Missouri
Ellisville, Wisconsin